Acrapex prisca is a moth of the family Noctuidae first described by Francis Walker in 1866. It is endemic to Sri Lanka.

References

External links
First Record of the Genus Acrapex from the New World, With Description of a New Species from the Carolinas and Virginia

Xyleninae
Moths of Sri Lanka
Moths described in 1866